Yengejeh-ye Molla Mohammad Reza (also Romanized as Yengejeh-ye Mollā Moḩammad Reẕā; also known as Nīkjeh) is a village in Dowlatabad Rural District, in the Central District of Namin County, Ardabil Province, Iran. At the 2006 census, its population was 355, in 97 families.

References 

Towns and villages in Namin County